Segiri Stadium is a multi-use stadium in Samarinda, East Kalimantan, Indonesia.  It is currently used mostly for football matches and is used as the home venue for Borneo Samarinda of the Liga 1. The stadium has a capacity of 16,000 spectators.

References

External links
Stadium information

Sports venues in Indonesia
Sports venues in East Kalimantan
Sports venues in Samarinda
Football venues in Indonesia
Football venues in East Kalimantan
Football venues in Samarinda
Athletics (track and field) venues in Indonesia
Athletics (track and field) venues in East Kalimantan
Athletics (track and field) venues in Samarinda
Rugby union stadiums in Indonesia
Multi-purpose stadiums in Indonesia
Multi-purpose stadiums in East Kalimantan
Multi-purpose stadiums in Samarinda
Buildings and structures in East Kalimantan
Samarinda
Sports venues completed in 1980